Manuel Pardo (1774–?) was a Spanish soldier who was the Interim Governor of the Province of Texas in 1817 and of Coahuila between 1819 and 1820. He participated in the Texas Revolution as the assistant to the Centralist Troops led by Martín Perfecto de Cos on the Mexican side.

Career 

Manuel Pardo was born in 1774, in Santander (Cantabria, Spain). He joined the Spanish Army in his youth and fought in the  military campaigns of France (in 1795), Portugal (1801), Aranjuez and Madrid (both in 1802 in the Community of Madrid). Pardo later traveled to New Spain where he joined the army. He was promoted to colonel.

On March 20, 1817, Pardo was appointed Interim Governor of the Province of Texas and held the position until may of that year. Pardo's successor, Antonio María Martínez, claimed the interim Governor had impoverished Texas and depleted military defenses.

In 1819, Pardo was appointed Governor of Coahuila, replacing José Franco. He governed Coahuila until November 25, 1820.

In 1822, Pardo became political chief of Monclova, Coahuila, and, in 1835, in the Texas Revolution, he was assistant of the troops of Martín Perfecto de Cos in Monclova.

References 

Governors of Spanish Texas
Governors of Coahuila
People of Mexican side in the Texas Revolution
1774 births
Year of death missing
People from Santander, Spain
1810s in Texas
1810s in Mexico